Louis Finot (8 July 1909 in Saint-Maur-des-Fossés – 14 February 1996) was a French footballer who played as a winger. He played for France between 1930 and 1934, earning seven international caps. He was a French league champion with FC Sochaux.

References

External links
 
 

1909 births
1996 deaths
Sportspeople from Saint-Maur-des-Fossés
Association football wingers
French footballers
France international footballers
FC Sochaux-Montbéliard players
Stade Rennais F.C. players
Stade de Reims players
OGC Nice players
Racing Club de France Football players
Amiens SC players
Red Star F.C. players
CA Paris-Charenton players
French football managers
Amiens SC managers
Footballers from Val-de-Marne